Margaret Larkin (July 7, 1899 – May 7, 1967) was an American writer, poet, singer-songwriter, researcher, journalist and union activist.

She wrote The Hand of Mordechai on a kibbutz in Israel and its stand against the Egyptian Army in 1948, Seven Shares in a Gold Mine about a murder conspiracy in Mexico, and the Singing Cowboy, a collection of Western folk songs. She won awards for her poem Goodbye—To My Mother and her play El Cristo.

Life
Larkin was born on July 7, 1899 in Las Vegas, New Mexico to parents from English and Scottish descent. She studied at the University of Kansas. In 1922 she won the Poetry Prize of the Kansas Author Club.

After moving to the East Coast, she married Liston Oak and became a trade union activist. In 1926 she wrote the titles of the silent film The Passaic Textile Strike. In the thirties she was active as a singer/songwriter and composer of folk songs.

After divorcing her first husband she met writer Albert Maltz in 1935. Maltz was 9 years younger. They married in 1937. Maltz was blacklisted as one of the Hollywood Ten due to his refusal to tell the House Un-American Activities Committee whether he was a member of the American Communist Party.

Larkin, her husband, their son Peter and daughter Katherine moved to Mexico City in 1951. In 1964 they were officially divorced, after Maltz had already returned to the United States.

Larkin assisted anthropologist Oscar Lewis in the research and writing of La vida: a Puerto Rican family in the culture of poverty--San Juan and New York (1966). Her last book was The Hand of Mordechai, on kibbutz Yad Mordechai around the 1947–1949 Palestine war. It was published in Hebrew (1966), Yiddish (1967), English (1968), German (1970), and Russian (197?). The Israeli edition was published by Ma'arachot, the official publishing house of the Israeli Defense Forces, with a preface by General Haim Laskov.  Larkin was represented by the literary agent Barthold Fles.

Margareth Larkin died in Mexico City on May 7, 1967, aged 67. Her son Peter also died in Mexico City. Her sole granddaughter, Gabriela Maltz Larkin, is an actress and production manager, more recently as Mira Larkin.

Bibliography

Books
 1926 - El Cristo, a drama in one act
 1931 - Singing Cowboy, a book of western songs
 1958 - Seven Shares in a Gold Mine
 1966 - The Hand of Mordechai (a.k.a. The Six Days of Yad Mordechai)

Poetry
 1922 - "Goodbye—To My Mother" in The Poets of the Future, A College Anthology for 1921-1922: 156
 1924 - "Four Poems", The Midlands 10: 385.

Articles
 1927-03 - "A Poet for the People: A Review" (of Langston Hughes: Fine Clothes to the Jew), Opportunity 3: 84-85.
 1929-10-09 - "Ella May's Songs". The Nation 129 (3353): 382-383.
 1933-02 - "Revolutionary music", New Masses: 27.
 1934-09-05 - "Beale Street: Where the Blues Began (Book review)". The Nation  139 (3609): 279.
 1966-11-14 - "As Many as God Sends? Family Planning in Mexico", The Nation 203 (16): 508-511.

Filmography
 1926 - The Passaic Textile Strike - title writer

Awards
 1922 - Best Poem submitted to the Kansas Authors' Club for Goodbye—To My Mother
 1926 - David Belasco Cup for El Cristo
 1926 - Samuel French Prize for El Cristo

References

External links

1899 births
1967 deaths
American women trade unionists
American expatriates in Mexico
American people of English descent
American people of Scottish descent
American singer-songwriters
University of Kansas alumni
Writers from New Mexico
American women poets
American women dramatists and playwrights
20th-century American dramatists and playwrights
20th-century American women writers
20th-century American singers
People from Las Vegas, New Mexico
Trade unionists from New Mexico
American folk-song collectors